The Garamantes were an ancient civilisation based primarily in the southern region of Libya. They most likely descended from Berber tribes and pastoralists from the Sahara. The Garamantes settled in the Fezzan region by at least 1000 BCE, and by the late 7th century CE, the Garamantian civilization had ceased.

Their growth and expansion was based on a complex and extensive qanat irrigation system (Berber: foggaras), which supported a strong agricultural economy and large population. They subsequently developed the first urban society in a major desert that was not centered on a river system; their largest town, Garama, had a population of around four thousand, with an additional six thousand living in surrounding suburban areas.

At its pinnacle, the Garamantian kingdom established and maintained a "standard of living far superior to that of any other ancient Saharan society." Until the mid-20th century, the Garamantes were believed to be a small and minor desert tribe. During the 1960s, archaeological excavations began to reveal that the Garamantes were "brilliant farmers, resourceful engineers, and enterprising merchants who produced a remarkable civilization."

History

The earliest known written record to document the Garamantes dates to the 5th century BCE. According to Herodotus, the Garamantes were "a very great nation" who herded cattle and farmed dates, and were also reported in an account to have been in pursuit of "Troglodyte Ethiopians" who lived in the desert, from four-horse chariots.

Roman depictions describe the Garamantes as bearing ritual scars and tattoos. Tacitus wrote that they assisted the rebel Tacfarinas and raided Roman coastal settlements. According to Pliny the Elder, Romans eventually grew tired of Garamantian raiding and Lucius Cornelius Balbus captured fifteen of their settlements in 19 BCE. In 202 CE, Septimius Severus captured the capital city of Garama.

The decline of the Garamantian culture may have been connected to worsening climatic conditions, or overuse of water resources. What is desert today was once fairly good agricultural land and was enhanced through the Garamantian irrigation system 1,500 years ago. As fossil water is a non-renewable resource, over the six centuries of the Garamantian kingdom, the ground water level fell.

Society

In the 1960s, archaeologists excavated part of the Garamantes' capital at modern Germa (situated around 150 km west of modern-day Sabha) and named it Garama (an earlier capital, Zinchecra, was located not far from the later Garama). Current research indicates that the Garamantes had about eight major towns, three of which have been examined as of 2004. In addition they had a large number of other settlements. Garama had a population of around four thousand and another six thousand living in villages within a 5 km radius.

Nikita et al. (2011) indicated that the skeletons of the Garamantes do not suggest regular warfare or strenuous activities. "The Garamantes exhibited low sexual dimorphism in the upper limbs, which is consistent to the pattern found in agricultural populations and implies that the engagement of males in warfare and construction works was not particularly intense. [...] the Garamantes did not appear systematically more robust than other North African populations occupying less harsh environments, indicating that life in the Sahara did not require particularly strenuous daily activities."

Archaeological ruins associated with the Garamantian kingdom include numerous tombs, forts, and cemeteries. The Garamantes constructed a network of tunnels, and shafts to mine the fossil water from under the limestone layer under the desert sand. The dating of these foggara is disputed, they appear between 200 BCE to 200 CE but continued to be in use until at least the 7th century and perhaps later. The network of tunnels is known to Berbers as Foggaras. The network allowed agriculture to flourish, and used a system of slave labor to keep it maintained.

Slave-raiding

Based on the Herodotus account that referenced the Garamantes hunting Ethiopian cave-dwellers, Sonja Magnavita and Carlos Magnavita stated:

Those taking Herodotus’ account verbatim might be disappointed that he remained silent on living merchandises potentially added to that gold (such as humans, i.e. slaves), but other parts of his text are conveniently interpreted with a view to slave raiding and trading: the Garamantes hunting the swift-footed Aithiopian Troglodytes on four-horse chariots. Whilst the chariots are identified in the form of Saharan rock art, the Troglodytes remain mysterious. Although the ancient Greek text does neither state whether these hunts were slave raids or not, nor where they actually took place, the frequent re-interpretation of this text passage was jointly responsible for the creation of the myth of Saharan slave raids against Black Africans in classical times. The scene – a drive-hunt on war-like chariots – gives rise to some speculation. Hunting people for other purposes than for enslaving them is admittedly hard to imagine, but nevertheless should be taken into consideration as long as speculation prevails.

Biological anthropology 

Marta Mirazón Lahr conducted research on skeletons from Fezzan dating to the Roman era and found that the skeletons most closely matched Neolithic Sahelian samples, from Chad, Mali, and Niger. Lahr associates these remains with the Garamantes, and concluded that the Garamantes had connections with both the Sahel and northern Africa. 

Nikita et al. (2011) examined the biological affinities of the Garamantes using cranial nonmetric traits and the Mean Measure of Divergence and Mahalanobis D(2). They were compared to other North African populations, including the Egyptian, Algerian, Tunisian and Sudanese, roughly contemporary to them. Overall, three clusters were identified: (1) the Garamantes, (2) Gizeh and Kerma, and (3) Soleb, Alexandrians, Algerians and Carthagians. The analysis concluded that the Garamantes were isolated, with the Sahara playing a role as a barrier to geneflow. The distance between the Garamantes and their neighbors was high and the population appeared to be an outlier.

The remains of a young Sub-Saharan African woman, which has been dated to the 1st millennium BCE and possessed a lip plug that is associated with Sahelian African groups, was buried among other Sub-Saharan Africans that were part of the heterogenous Garamantian population. Power et al. (2019) states: "This ornament demonstrates that some Garamantes individuals shared aspects of their material culture with Sahelian societies more broadly, either through migration or contact, while their burial within Garamantes cemeteries shows their integration into the normative funerary rituals of contemporary Garamantian society. The combination of morphometric and isotopic work further reinforces the view that Garamantian society included individuals of diverse geographical origin, some of whom may have been first generation Trans-Saharan migrants." The craniometrics results also identified another sub-group within the Garamantes buried in the Wadi al-Ajjal. The morphology is observed widely among Mediterranean people.

Script

The Garamantes may have used a nearly indecipherable form of proto-Tifinagh. Blench (2019) states:

One of the most problematic aspects is the language and inscriptions attributed to the Garamantes...Sites in the vicinity of Jarma, the Garamantian capital of what is now known as Fazzan, have abundant inscriptions (Fig. 14.7). 67 They are found cut or painted on dark grey amphorae, in the tombs of Garamantian cemeteries, such as those of Saniat bin Huwaydi.68 A recent project under the auspices of the British Library has digitised most of the known inscriptions and these are described in Biagetti et al.69 Although the inscriptions are in Berber characters, only some are decipherable. Various reasons for this have been suggested; either the messages were deliberately coded, so that only specific readers could understand them. Alternatively, they may have had a ‘ludic’ nature. The most exciting possibility is that they were in a non-Berber language, perhaps Nilo-Saharan or something unknown.

References

Further reading

 Belmonte, Juan Antonio; Esteban, César; Perera Betancort, Maria Antonia; Marrero, Rita. "Archaeoastronomy in the Sahara: The Tombs of the Garamantes at Wadi el Agial, Fezzan, Libya". In: Journal for the History of Astronomy Supplement, Vol. 33, 2002.
 Borg, Victor Paul. "The Garamantes masters of the Sahara". Geographical, Vol. 79, August 2007.
 Camps, Gabriel. Les Garamantes, conducteurs de chars et bâtisseurs dans le Fezzan antique . Clio.fr (2002).
 Gearon, Eamonn. The Sahara: A Cultural History. Signal Books, UK, 2011. Oxford University Press, USA, 2011.
 .
 Bryn Mawr Classical Review of David. J. Mattingly (ed.), The Archaeology of Fazzan. Volume 2. Site Gazetteer, Pottery and Other Survey Finds. Society for Libyan Studies Monograph 7. London: The Society for Libyan Studies and Socialist People's Libyan Arab Jamahariya Department of Antiquities, 2007. Pp. xxix, 522, figs. 760, tables 37. .
 Karim Sadr (Reviewer): Who Were The Garamantes And What Became Of Them? The Archaeology of Fazzan. Volume I: Synthesis. Edited by David J. Mattingly. London: Society for Libyan Studies, and Tripoli: Department of Antiquities, 2003. Review in The Journal of African History (2004), 45: 492-493
 .

External links

 romansonline.com : Classical Latin texts citing the Garamantes.
 LiveScience.com article - about "lost cities" built by the Garamantes in Libya, most dating between AD 1 to 500, 7 November 2011

Countries in ancient Africa
Berber peoples and tribes
Berber history
Ancient Libya
Ancient Libyans
History of Fezzan
History of the Sahara
Ancient Greek geography of North Africa